Noel Alonso Pérez (born 19 March 1987 in Gijón, Asturias) is a Spanish professional footballer who plays as a left back.

External links

1987 births
Living people
Footballers from Gijón
Spanish footballers
Association football defenders
Segunda División players
Segunda División B players
Tercera División players
Sporting de Gijón B players
Sporting de Gijón players
CF Palencia footballers
Celta de Vigo B players
RC Celta de Vigo players
UD Melilla footballers
Pontevedra CF footballers
UP Langreo footballers
Caudal Deportivo footballers
SK Austria Klagenfurt players
Spain youth international footballers
Spanish expatriate footballers
Expatriate footballers in Austria
Spanish expatriate sportspeople in Austria